Sơn Tịnh is a district of Quảng Ngãi province, in the South Central Coast region of Vietnam, situated to the northeast of the town of Quảng Ngãi. The hamlet of Mỹ Lai of the Sơn Mỹ village, Tinh Khe commune was the site of the massacre of non-combatants committed by United States Army troops in 1968, today documented in Son My Memorial Park in Son My's sub-hamlet of Tu Cung.

My Khe Beach is an attractive 8 km long beach situated in the Co Luy Village of Tinh Khe commune.

Tinh Phong Industrial Park (khu công nghiệp Tịnh Phong) is located in Son Tinh District. Dai Cat Tuong textile factory (owned by Vinatex) is located here.

Administration
The district has 21 communes (xã):
Thị trấn Sơn Tịnh
Tịnh Long
Tịnh An
Tịnh Châu
Tịnh Thiện
Tịnh Hòa
Tịnh Kỳ
Tịnh Sơn
Tịnh Hà
Tịnh Thọ
Tịnh Ấn Đông
Tịnh Ấn Tây 
Tịnh Khê
Tịnh Bình
Tịnh Đông
Tịnh Trà
Tịnh Giang
Tịnh Minh
Tịnh Hiệp
Tịnh Bắc

References

See also
My Lai Massacre

Districts of Quảng Ngãi province